The Mirfield Free Grammar (also known as the MFG) and sixth form is a secondary school in the town of Mirfield, West Yorkshire, England.

Patrick Stewart was a student at the MFG and, in September 2011, he opened the school as an academy. The school was rated 'Outstanding' by Ofsted in both 2008 and 2012.

In 2013 a new extension was added to the sports centre which included a state-of-the-art Dance Studio and Gym.

The school underwent major renovations that were completed by September 2014, they included a brand new Music, Drama and DT classrooms, as well as a redeveloped quad area with ramp access for students that required the permanent demolition of existing buildings.

Notable former pupils
Patrick Stewart, an actor most widely known for his roles as Captain Jean-Luc Picard in Star Trek: The Next Generation and its successor films, as Professor Charles Xavier in the X-Men film series, and also for his prolific stage roles with the Royal Shakespeare Company.

References

Academies in Kirklees
Educational institutions established in the 1660s
Secondary schools in Kirklees
1667 establishments in England